Staphylinochrous ruficilia is a species of moth of the Anomoeotidae family. It is found in Cameroon.

References

Endemic fauna of Cameroon
Anomoeotidae
Insects of Cameroon
Moths of Africa